Mohamed Abdel Razek (born 1 September 1993), known by his nickname Bazoka, is an Egyptian footballer who plays for Egyptian Premier League side Tala'ea El Gaish as a centre-back.

References

1993 births
Living people
People from Sharqia Governorate
Egyptian footballers
Egyptian Premier League players
Association football defenders
El Sharkia SC players
Zamalek SC players
Al Ittihad Alexandria Club players
Tala'ea El Gaish SC players